Ligia Grozav married Bara (born 26 January 1994) is a Romanian high jumper, who won an individual gold medal at the Youth World Championships.

Biography
Ligia Damaris (Grozav) married Valentin Bara on 9 August 2014. She lives in Oradea with her husband and her daughter.

References

External links
 
 Ligia-Damaris Bara at EAA
 Ligia Damaris Bara at All-Athletics
 Ligia Damaris Grozav at COSR
 Grozav Ligia Damaris at Clubul Sportiv Universitar Oradea

1994 births
Living people
Romanian female high jumpers